The 1991 Copa Libertadores was won by Colo-Colo of Chile after defeating Olimpia of Paraguay with a 3–0 aggregate score in the finals. The championship would mark a first for a Chilean club team in an international tournament. Twenty-one clubs from all South American countries within Confederación Sudamericana de Fútbol (CONMEBOL) participated.

Group stage

Group 1

Group 2

Group 3

Group 4

Group 5

 Colombian club teams América, and Atlético Nacional were unable to play at their home venues. Their games were held in Miami, Florida and San Cristóbal, Venezuela.

Round of 16
 The top three teams in every group qualified along with Olimpia the champion of Copa Libertadores 1990
 First leg matches were played on April 16 and April 17, 1991. Second leg matches were played on April 24 and April 25, 1991.

Quarterfinals
 First leg matches were played on May 1, May 2, and May 3, 1991. Second leg matches played on May 8 and May 10, 1991.

Semifinals
 First leg matches played on May 16, 1991. Second leg matches played on May 22 and May 23, 1991.

Finals

First leg match played on May 29, 1991, in Asunción, Paraguay at Defensores del Chaco stadium. Second leg final match played on June 5, 1991, in Santiago, Chile at Estadio Monumental David Arellano.

Colo-Colo won 3-0 on aggregate.

Champion

External links
1991 Copa Libertadores at RSSSF.com
Detailed match reports at RSSSF.com

1
Copa Libertadores seasons